Labramia is a genus of plants in the family Sapotaceae described as a genus in 1844. De Candolle initially named the genus Delastrea, which is a homonym for an older fungus name by Tulasne, so De Candolle changed the name to Labramia in the appendix to the same book.

Labramia is native to certain islands in the Indian Ocean (Madagascar and nearby Mayotte).

Species
 Labramia ankaranaensis Aubrév. - Madagascar
 Labramia boivinii (Pierre) Aubrév. - Madagascar
 Labramia bojeri A.DC. - Madagascar
 Labramia capuronii Aubrév. - Madagascar
 Labramia costata (Hartog ex Baill.) Aubrév. - Madagascar
 Labramia louvelii Aubrév. - Madagascar
 Labramia mayottensis Labat, M.Pignal & O.Pascal - Mayotte
 Labramia platanoides Capuron ex Aubrév. - Madagascar
 Labramia sambiranensis Capuron ex Aubrév. - Madagascar

References

Sapotoideae
Sapotaceae genera